Mishaal is an Arabic name which is mostly used as a masculine given name. People with the name include:

 Mishaal bin Hamad bin Khalifa Al Thani (born 1972), Qatari royal and former crown prince of Qatar
 Mishaal bin Saud Al Rashid (1913–1931), member of Rashidi dynasty 
 Mishal Al-Ahmad Al-Jaber Al-Sabah (born 1940), crown prince of Kuwait
 Mishaal bin Abdulaziz Al Saud (1926–2017), Saudi royal and government official 
 Mishaal bin Abdullah Al Saud (born 1970) (born 1970), Saudi royal and government official
 Mishaal bin Abdullah Al Saud, Saudi royal and government official
 Mishaal bint Fahd Al Saud (1958–1977), Saudi royal
 Mishaal bin Majid Al Saud (born 1957), Saudi royal and government official
 Mishaal bin Saud Al Saud (born 1940), Saudi royal and military officer

Arabic masculine given names
Arabic feminine given names